Aloysia catamarcensis is a species of flowering plant in the family Verbenaceae, native to northwestern Argentina.

References

catamarcensis
Flora of Northwest Argentina
Plants described in 1942